William Hartanto known professionally as Boy William, is an entertainer. He first started his career by winning the Starteen model election in 2009 where he showed his talent for dancing the Haka Dance. He represented his school in the Haka Dance Competition in Africa for a month. Then, he switched to become a VJ on the MTV Indonesia. He also had leading roles in Indonesian films Di Balik 98 and Sunshine Becomes You. He is currently a VJ of Breakout on the television channel NET.

Filmography
 Mama Cake (2012)
 Fallin' in Love (2012)
 Potong Bebek Angsa
 Comic 8 (2014)
 Rumah Gurita (Octopus Home)
 Di Balik 98 (In Behind 98) (2015)
 The Night Comes For Us
 Tarot (2015)
 Sunshine Becomes You (2015)
 Stay with me (2015)
 Dimsun Martabak (2017)
 Laundry (2019)
 Imperfect (2019)

Soap operas 
 Cinta Cenat Cenut 2
 Putih Abu-Abu 2

FTVs 
 I Miss You, I Need You, I Love You
 Cinta Terakhir Bukan Pacar Pertama (Last Love Not First Girlfriend)
 Datang Ke Jogja Untuk Cinta (Come To Jogja For Love)
 Mama Saingan Cintaku
 2 Hati 2 Cinta (2 Heart 2 Love)
 Indahnya Cinta Pertama
 Ramalan Bikin Galau
 From Asinan With Love

As presenter 
 MTV Ping (Global TV)
 MTV Station Camp (Global TV)
 Breakout (NET TV)
 Nez Academy (NET TV)
 NET. One Anniversary (NET TV)
 Miss World 2013 Red Carpet (RCTI)
 Dahsyat Awards 2012 Red Carpet (RCTI)
 Teenlicious (Global TV)
 Super Boy (Global TV)
 Akhirnya Datang Juga (MNCTV)
 (MNC Music Channel)
 Rising Star Indonesia (RCTI)
 Indonesian Idol (RCTI)
 Siapa Mau Jadi Juara (Trans TV)

Songs 
 Stranger in My Bed (Original Soundtrack of TAROT), 2015
 Flyin' Money (feat. Ananta Vinnie), 2017
 Bumblebee (feat. Ananta Vinnie), 2017

References

External links 
  Berita Resmi: Biodata Boy William
 

Living people
Indonesian people of Chinese descent
Indonesian actors
Indonesian rappers
Year of birth missing (living people)